The William L. Welsh Terrace is a multi-family dwelling located at 101-105 West Dutton Street in Kalamazoo, Michigan. It was listed on the National Register of Historic Places in 1983.

History
William L. Welsh was one of Kalamazoo's prominent nineteenth-century builders. In 1895, Welsh constructed this small apartment building on land adjacent to his house. The building was designed as a triplex for well-to-do families. Among the first occupants of the Welsh Terrace was Kalamazoo paper manufacturer Frank Milham, one of the
founders of the Bryant Paper Mill.

Description
The Welsh Terrace is a three-story brick veneer Colonial Revival structure topped with a mansard roof. The facade is divided into three parts, with a central, projecting pavilion flanked by an engaged towers with conical roofs. A broad Tuscan-column front porch extends across the structure. Bay window units on each side elevation also have high, conical roofs. Dentiled cornices run under the roof. Gabled dormers, some containing round-headed windows, pierce the mansard roof.

References

		
National Register of Historic Places in Kalamazoo County, Michigan
Colonial Revival architecture in Michigan
Buildings and structures completed in 1895